International rankings of Haiti include economic, health, and political data.

Economy

World Bank 2015  Nominal GDP ranked 141 out of 194 economies

Politics

Transparency International 2015  Corruption Perception Index ranked 158/168 countries (lowest ranking in the Caribbean)
 Heritage Foundation 2016 Index of Economic Freedom ranked 150.

Society

United Nations Development Programme 2015 Human Development Index: ranked 163 out of 188
University of Leicester 2006 Satisfaction with Life Index 118 out of 178

See also
 Lists of countries
 Lists by country
 List of international rankings

References 

International rankings
Haiti